The 1974 U.S. Women's Open was the 29th U.S. Women's Open, held July 18–21 at La Grange Country Club in La Grange, Illinois, a suburb west of Chicago.

Past champions in the field

Source:

Final leaderboard
Sunday, July 21, 1974

Source:

References

External links
Golf Observer final leaderboard
U.S. Women's Open Golf Championship
La Grange Country Club

U.S. Women's Open
Golf in Illinois
Sports competitions in Illinois
La Grange, Illinois
U.S. Women's Open
U.S. Women's Open
U.S. Women's Open
Women's sports in Illinois